A cloudburst occurred on 28 July 2021 in Hunzar hamlet in the Dachhan area of the Kishtwar district in Jammu & Kashmir, resulting in 26 deaths and 17 injuries.

Casualties
As per reports, 7 dead bodies were recovered while 19 were not found in the initial days following the cloudburst. As of October 5, 2021, one out of the 19 missing was found after more than 70 days, while 18 others remain missing.

References

Jammu and Kashmir
Kishtwar district
2021 in India